Gilów may refer to the following places in Poland:
Gilów, Lower Silesian Voivodeship (south-west Poland)
Gilów, Lublin Voivodeship (east Poland)
Gilów, Świętokrzyskie Voivodeship (south-central Poland)
Gilów, Lubusz Voivodeship (west Poland)